Real Simple is an American monthly magazine published by Dotdash Meredith. The magazine features articles and information related to homemaking, childcare, cooking, and emotional well-being. The magazine is distinguished by its clean, uncluttered style of layout and photos. Out of the 7.6 million readers, 90% are women. Headquartered in New York City, the magazine is currently edited by Sarah Collins, who began serving as interim editor-in-chief in September 2016 after the departure of previous editor Kristin van Ogtrop.

Real Simple expanded to include a TV show of the same name, with two seasons of a half-hour program airing on PBS in 2006–2007. A TLC show entitled Real Simple Real Life aired over two seasons in 2008–2009.

Real Simple in other media

Applications 
In December 2010, Real Simple launched its first application, "No Time to Cook?", on the iTunes Store sponsored by Sara Lee's Hillshire Farms. It targets iPhone, Android, and iPad users and features over 850 step-by-step recipes.

In 2010, Real Simple added another app titled Real Simple To-Do Lists to its array of apps. To-Do Lists helps users organize their lives into lists.

Additionally, on Mother's Day 2012, Real Simple created a Gift Guide app available on the Apple App Store that had a selection of items for people to buy. Users also had the option to donate to the launch partner, March of Dimes.

Editor 
 Sarah Collins

Directors 
 Heather Muir—Beauty Director
 Victoria Sanchez-Lincoln—Fashion Director
 Dawn Perry—Food Director
 Betsy Goldberg—Home Director

References

External links
 Official Site
 PBS Web Site

2000s American television news shows
2006 American television series debuts
Lifestyle magazines published in the United States
Monthly magazines published in the United States
IAC (company)
Magazines established in 2000
Magazines published in New York City
PBS original programming
Television series by WGBH